Bernhard Droog (5 January 1921 in Cologne, Germany – 22 December 2009 in Ede, Netherlands) was a Dutch actor who appeared in 17 films, including the 1997 Academy Award-winning Character, and numerous television and theatre roles.  Droog was a recipient of the Order of Orange-Nassau in 1970.

Early life 
Droog was born to Dutch parents living in Germany.  He lived there until 1936, when the family decided to return to the Netherlands and moved to the city of Haarlem.  Droog took up employment in a chemist's laboratory, and continued this work after another move to The Hague. He initially studied singing, with a view to joining an opera company (his parents had worked as semi-professional opera singers)  but in 1945 he became a member of a theatre group run by Pierre Balledux, for whom he would make over 300 appearances.

Film career 
Droog's film debut came in 1955 in the role of Leraar in Ciske de Rat, based on a famous children's novel by author Piet Bakker, which in terms of cinema admissions remains one of the most popular films in Dutch history.  He would appear in two comedy films, Kleren Maken de Man and Fanfare, followed by a leading role in the 1958 Academy Award-nominated Dorp aan de rivier.  He also appeared in 1962 World War II drama De Overval.

After the early 1960s, Droog's film appearances became sporadic as he worked mainly in theatre and television.  However he made notable appearances in Wat zien ik, a 1971 comedy centred on the lives of two Amsterdam prostitutes (and the first feature film directed by Paul Verhoeven), and another World War II feature, 1978's Pastorale 1943.  Droog's final screen appearance came in 1997 in Character, which went on to win that year's Academy Award for Best Foreign Language Film.

Death 
The last decade of Droog's life was spent out of the public eye.  He died of pneumonia on 22 December 2009, aged 88.

Filmography 
1953: Rechter Thomas (dir. Walter Smith)
1955: Ciske de Rat (dir. Wolfgang Staudte) - Leraar
1957: De vliegende Hollander (dir. Gerard Rutten)
1957: Kleren Maken de Man (dir. Georg Jacoby)
1958: Dorp aan de rivier (dir. Fons Rademakers) - Cis den Dove
1958: Fanfare (dir. Bert Haanstra) - Krijns
1960: De zaak M.P. (dir. Bert Haanstra) - Jef
1961: De Laatste Passagier (dir. Jef van der Heyden) - Maartjes vader
1962: Kermis in de Regen (dir. Kees Brusse) - Eigenaar gestolen auto (uncredited)
1962: De Overval (dir. Paul Rotha) - Jellema
1963: Fietsen naar de Maan (dir. Jef van der Heyden) - Politieagent Henk Egmond
1964: Spuit elf (dir. Paul Cammermans) - Pastoor
1971: Wat zien ik (dir. Paul Verhoeven) - Bob de Vries
1978: Pastorale 1943 (dir. Wim Verstappen) - Poerstamper
1979: Kort Amerikaans (dir. Guido Pieters) - Van Grouw
1979: Erik of het klein insectenboek (TV Series, dir. Hank Onrust) - Bij
1979: Een pak slaag (dir. Bert Haanstra) - Vrijst
1980: De Verjaring (TV Movie, dir. Kees Brusse) - Guus
1987: De ratelrat (dir. Wim Verstappen) - Commissaris
1997: Character (dir. Mike van Diem) - Stroomkoning (final film role)

References 

1921 births
2009 deaths
Dutch male film actors
Dutch male television actors
Dutch male stage actors
Actors from Cologne
Deaths from pneumonia in the Netherlands
Dutch expatriates in Germany